Cuzco Quechua is a dialect of Southern Quechua spoken in Cuzco and the Cuzco Region of Peru.

It is the Quechua variety used by the Academia Mayor de la Lengua Quechua in Cuzco, which also prefers the Spanish-based five-vowel alphabet. On the other hand, the official alphabet used by the ministry of education has only three vowels.

Phonology 
There is debate about whether Cuzco Quechua has five /a, e, i, o, u/ or three vowels: /a, i, u/.

Grammar

Pronouns

Nouns

Adjectives

Verbs

See also 
 Quechuan and Aymaran spelling shift

References

External links 
 Simi Taqe Qheswa - Español - Qheswa (Qheswa simi hamut'ana kuraq suntur), Qosqo, Peru, 2006 (pdf 3,8 MB). Dictionary of the AMLQ: Cusco-Quechua - Spanish, Spanish - Cusco-Quechua.
Collections in the Archive of the Indigenous Languages of Latin America

Languages of Peru
Southern Quechua